SMU Kristen 1 Bandung (also known as SMUK 1 or SMAK 1) is a Protestant high school located in Bandung, Indonesia. It is part of the BPK PENABUR schools in Indonesia

Schools in Bandung